The Selenga Highlands are a mountainous area in Buryatia and the southwestern end of Zabaykalsky Krai, Russia.

The Highlands are named after the Selenga River. Protected areas in the Highlands include the Baikal Nature Reserve and the Altacheysky Reserve.

Geography
The Selenga Highlands are located in central and southern Buryatia. They rise in the area of the basin of the Selenga River, including its large tributaries – Dzhida, Temnik River, Chikoy, Khilok and Uda. 
From the north, the highlands are edged by the valleys of the Khamar-Daban and Ulan-Burgas ranges; in the east they are bound by the watershed of the Uda, Vitim and Shilka, bordering on the Vitim Plateau. In the southeast they adjoin the Khentei-Daur Highlandsand to the south lies the Mongolia–Russia border. In the southwest and west, the Highlands are bounded by the northern slopes of the Dzhidinsky Range and the southwestern slopes of the Lesser Khamar-Daban. Lake Gusinoye is located in a basin between two ranges of the highlands.

Subranges
Borgoy Range, highest point 
Burgutuy Range, highest point 
Zagan Range, highest point 
Western Malkhan Range, highest point 
Monostoy Range, highest point 
Khambin Range, highest point 
Khudan Range, highest point 
Tsagan-Daban, highest point 
Lesser Khamar-Daban (southern slopes only)
Ulan-Burgas (eastern and southern slopes only)
Smaller ranges, such as Ganzurin Range, Shaman Mountains and Toyon among others.

Intermontane basins
In the Selenga Highlands some areas between ranges are occupied by significant depressions. These include:
Other important intermontane basins are Borgoy, Ubukun-Orongoy, Udin-Ivolgin and Khudan-Kizhingin, among others.

Flora and climate
The Selenga Highlands include taiga, steppe and forest steppe areas. Roughly two-thirds of the highlands are covered by mainly coniferous forests, but large areas of birch forests are also found. Of the rare plant species, the Siberian apricot, listed in the Red Book of Buryatia, deserves mention.

The climate of the Highlands area is harshly continental. Further up the watershed of the river's tributaries it reaches .

Bibliography
Natalʹi︠a︡ Vasilʹevna Fadeeva, Селенгинское среднегорье: природные условия и районирование (Selenga Highlands: Natural Conditions and Zoning) Buryat Book Publishing House, 1963 – Physical geography – 169 pages, 
S. Baja, E. Danzhalova, Yu. Drobyshev, Трансформация наземных экосистем южной части бассейна Байкала (Transformation of terrestrial ecosystems in the southern part of the Baikal basin). 2018,

See also
Transbaikal

References

External links
Nature Reserves of Baikal
Selenga Highlands – Geological portal GeoKniga 

Mountain ranges of Russia
Landforms of Buryatia
Landforms of Zabaykalsky Krai
South Siberian Mountains